Aulis Heikki Sallinen (born 9 April 1935) is a Finnish contemporary classical music composer. His music has been variously described as "remorselessly harsh", a "beautifully crafted amalgam of several 20th-century styles", and "neo-romantic". Sallinen studied at the Sibelius Academy, where his teachers included Joonas Kokkonen. He has had works commissioned by the Kronos Quartet, and has also written seven operas, eight symphonies, concertos for violin, cello, flute, horn, and English horn, as well as several chamber works. He won the Nordic Council Music Prize in 1978 for his opera Ratsumies (The Horseman).

Childhood and studies
Sallinen was born in Salmi. During his childhood the family moved several times for his father's work, and during Evacuation of Finnish Karelia in 1944 the family relocated to Uusikaupunki, where Aulis Sallinen attended his schools.

His first instruments were violin and piano. He would play both jazz and classical music. He was known to be extremely creative and spent much time during his teenage years improvising. After a while, he began writing his ideas down on paper and began serious composition. He attended the Sibelius Academy of Music and studied with a number of prestigious teachers such as Aarre Merikanto and Joonas Kokkonen.

Early career and operas
After graduating, Sallinen took a position as composition teacher at the Sibelius Academy and continued composing. Among his pupils were i.e. the Austrian-born Finnish composer Herman Rechberger and Jouni Kaipainen. He was appointed as the general manager of the Finnish Radio Symphony Orchestra in 1960 and held the position until 1969. He was the chairman of the board of the Society of Finnish Composers between 1971 and 1974. Though he was a known teacher and was on many boards of directors, his compositions were not particularly noted until he was made "Artist Professor" by the Finnish government in 1976, letting him concentrate on composing.

Sallinen's first opera Ratsumies (The Horseman) premiered at the Savonlinna Opera Festival in 1975. Together with Joonas Kokkonen's The Last Temptations (1975) it started a golden era of modern Finnish opera. His second opera, Punainen viiva (The Red Line), was commissioned by the Finnish National Opera. Sallinen's next opera, Kuningas lähtee Ranskaan (The King Goes Forth to France), was a joint commission by Covent Garden and the Finnish National Opera.

Later life
After receiving his lifelong art professorship, Sallinen devoted great amounts of time to composing. He has revived standard forms and harmonies, but he puts them together in contemporary ways. He has received a number of commissions from renowned ensembles and has composed eight symphonies, including one using material from a proposed ballet based on The Lord of the Rings  and containing two mediaeval Finnish tunes from the Piae Cantiones. He has written seven operas and is well known as the composer of the title track of the Kronos Quartet's album Winter Was Hard.

Career highlights
1960 – awarded diploma from the Sibelius Academy
1960–1970 – was administrator of the Finnish Radio Symphony Orchestra
1978 – awarded the Nordic Council Music Prize for The Horseman
1981 – became the first person to be made a professor of Arts for life by the Finnish Government, enabling him to concentrate on composing full-time
1983 – awarded the Wihuri Sibelius Prize
2004 – released the first in a series of recordings of complete orchestral music on the CPO label

Selected works

Operas
 The Horseman, Op. 32 (1974, Finnish: Ratsumies; Swedish: Ryttaren)
 The Red Line, Op. 46 (1978)
 The King Goes Forth to France, Op. 53 (1983, Finnish: Kuningas lähtee Ranskaan)
 Kullervo, Op. 61 (1988)
 The Palace, Op. 68 (1991–1993, Finnish: Palatsi)
 King Lear, Op. 76 (1999)
 Castle in the Water, chronicle for a narrator, four singers, and chamber orchestra (2017, Finnish: Linna vedessä)

Symphonies
 Symphony No. 1, Op. 24 (1970–71)
 Symphony No. 2, Symphonic Dialogue, for percussionist and orchestra, Op. 29 (1972)
 Symphony No. 3, Op. 35 (1974–75)
 Symphony No. 4, Op. 49 (1978–79)
 Symphony No. 5, Washington Mosaics, Op. 57 (1984–85, r. 1987)
 Symphony No. 6, From a New Zealand Diary, Op. 65 (1989–90)
 Symphony No. 7, The Dreams of Gandalf, Op. 71 (1996)
 Symphony No. 8, Autumnal Fragments, Op. 81 (2001)

Orchestral
 Mauermusik, Op. 7 (1963)
 Variations for Orchestra, Op. 8 (1963)
 Chorali, for wind orchestra, Op. 22 (1970)
 Chamber Music I, for string orchestra, Op. 38 (1975)
 Chamber Music II, for alto flute and string orchestra Op. 41 (1976)
 Dies Irae, for soprano, bass, male choir and orchestra, Op. 47 (1978)
 Shadows, prelude for orchestra, Op. 52 (1982)
 Chamber Music III, The Nocturnal Dances of Don Juanquixote, for cello and string orchestra, Op. 58 (1985–86)
 Sunrise Serenade, Op. 63 (1989)
 Songs of Life and Death, for baritone, choir and orchestra, Op. 69 (1995)
 Palace Rhapsody for wind orchestra, Op. 72 (1996)
 Introduction and Tango Overture, for piano and string orchestra, Op. 74b (1997)
 A Solemn Overture (King Lear), Op. 75 (1997)
 Chamber Music IV, Metamorphoses of Elegy for Sebastian Knight, for piano and string orchestra, Op. 79 (2000)
 Chamber Music V, Barabbas Variations, for accordion (or piano) and string orchestra, Op. 80 (2000)
 Chamber Music VI, 3 invitations au voyage, for string quartet and string orchestra, Op. 88 (2006)
 Chamber Music VII, Cruseliana, for wind quintet and string orchestra, Op. 93 (2007)
 Chamber Music VIII, The Trees, All Their Green (Paavo Haavikko in memoriam), for cello and string orchestra, Op. 94 (2008)

Concertos
 Violin Concerto, Op. 18 (1968)
 Cello Concerto, Op. 44 (1977)
 Flute Concerto, Harlequin, Op. 70 (1995)
 Horn Concerto, Campane ed Arie, Op. 82 (2002)
 Chamber Concerto, for violin, piano, and string orchestra, Op. 87 (2005)
 Concerto for Clarinet, Viola, and Chamber Orchestra, Op. 91 (2007) (also for clarinet, cello, and chamber orchestra, Op. 91a)
 English Horn Concerto, Op. 97 (2010–11)

Chamber music
 String Quartet No. 1, Op. 2 (1958)
 String Quartet No. 2 Canzona, Op. 4 (1960)
 Quattro per quattro, Op. 12 (1965)
 String Quartet No. 3 Some Aspects of Peltoniemi Hintrik's Funeral March, Op. 19 (1969)
 Four Etudes for violin & piano, Op.21 (1970)
 String Quartet No. 4 Quiet Songs, Op. 25 (1971)
 Sonata for Solo Cello, Op. 26 (1971)
 Metamorphora, for cello & piano, Op. 34 (1974)
 String Quartet No. 5 Pieces of Mosaic, Op. 54 (1983)
 From a Swan Song, for cello & piano, Op. 67 (1991)
 Barabbus Dialogues, for vocalists, narrator & chamber ensemble, Op. 84 (2003/2023)
 Piano Quintet ...des morceaux oublies, Op. 85 (2004)
 Cello Sonata, Op. 86 (2004)
 Windy Winter in Provence for Tenor, Piano, Violin & Guitar, Op. 89 (2006)
 Mistral Music for Solo Flute, Op. 90 (2005) (also for flute & string quartet, Op. 90a)
 Piano Quintet No. 2 Three Kullervo Elegies, Op. 92 (2006)
 Preludes and Fugues for Solo Accordion, Op. 95 (2009)
 Piano Trio Les Visions Fugitives, Op. 96 (2010)
 "Die Virtuose Tafelmusik von Don Juanquijote" for Accordion & Cello, Op. 98 (2011)
 "...memories, memories..." for Children's Choir, Piano & Strings, Op. 99 (2011)
 Five Portraits of Women for Soprano, Horn & Chamber Orchestra, Op. 100 (2012)
 Baumgesang mit Epilog for Cello & Piano, Op. 101 (2013)
 Three Adagios for Organ, Op. 102 (2013)
 String Quartet No. 6, Op. 103 (2014)

Vocal and choral
 Songs from the Sea, Op. 33 for unaccompanied children's choir, based on Finnish folk songs and a poem by the composer's two sons
 Song Around a Song, Op. 50 (1980) – Four folk songs in Italian, Japanese, Finnish, and English for unaccompanied children's choir
 The Iron Age: Suite, Op. 55, arranged from music for Finnish TV series based on the Kalevala
 The Beaufort Scale, Op. 56 (1984), humoresque for unaccompanied choir, based on the wind velocity scale

References

External links

 Aulis Sallinen's homepage at Novello & Co.
 Biographical information and list of works at the Finnish Music Information Centre.
 Aulis Sallinen at Pytheas Center for Contemporary Music.

1935 births
Living people
People from Pitkyarantsky District
Finnish classical composers
Finnish opera composers
Male opera composers
20th-century classical composers
21st-century classical composers
Sibelius Academy alumni
Academic staff of Sibelius Academy
Finnish male classical composers
20th-century male musicians
21st-century male musicians
20th-century Finnish composers
21st-century Finnish composers